The Grünsee lies in the most western part of the Pflersch Valley (left side valley of the Eisack river below Brenner) 1,680 metres above sea level. To get to the lake, one has to go by car until Ochsen alpine hut and then on foot straight ahead app. 11 km in western direction to the Lake. The road is not accessible in winter for cars.l
As a typical mountain lake the water is very clean (A grade quality). It remains even in summer cold. The Lake was created as remnant, when the Feuerstein Ferner had drawn itself. It gives fishes as trouts and carps a protected, untouched living space. Fresh water is gained by rain or snow melting. Sometimes the water stains green due this and that is the reason of its name. The Lake drains subterraneously via the Fernerbach (= Pflerscher Bach/Main River of the valley) and belongs to its source area.

Lakes of South Tyrol